1 Samuel 25 is the twenty-fifth chapter of the First Book of Samuel in the Old Testament of the Christian Bible or the first part of the Books of Samuel in the Hebrew Bible. According to Jewish tradition the book was attributed to the prophet Samuel, with additions by the prophets Gad and Nathan, but modern scholars view it as a composition of a number of independent texts of various ages from c. 630–540 BCE. This chapter contains the account of David's escape from Saul's repeated attempts to kill him. This is within a section comprising 1 Samuel 16 to 2 Samuel 5 which records the rise of David as the king of Israel.

Text
This chapter was originally written in the Hebrew language. It is divided into 22 verses.

Textual witnesses
Some early manuscripts containing the text of this chapter in Hebrew are of the Masoretic Text tradition, which includes the Codex Cairensis (895), Aleppo Codex (10th century), and Codex Leningradensis (1008). Fragments containing parts of this chapter in Hebrew were found among the Dead Sea Scrolls including 4Q51 (4QSam; 100–50 BCE) with extant verses 3–12, 20–21, 25–27, 38–40 and 4Q53 (4QSam; 100–75 BCE) with extant verses 30–31.

Extant ancient manuscripts of a translation into Koine Greek known as the Septuagint (originally was made in the last few centuries BCE) include Codex Vaticanus (B; B; 4th century) and Codex Alexandrinus (A; A; 5th century).

Places 

Carmel
Maon 
Paran
Ramah

Death of Samuel (25:1)
And Samuel died; and all the Israelites were gathered together, and lamented him, and buried him in his house at Ramah.
And David arose, and went down to the wilderness of Paran.
Samuel's death was at a time when Saul had acknowledged the issue of succession (24:20) and that David, the one anointed by Samuel, would come to the throne. 
"The wilderness of Paran" according to Masoretic Text. Septuagint has 'the wilderness of Maon'.

David, Nabal, and Abigail (25:2–44)

The accounts in 1 Samuel 24 and 26 report David's refusal to kill Saul as God's anointed, but in this chapter, he was almost guilty of killing many innocent people in the household of Nabal and Abigail who lived in Maon. Nabal (in Hebrew meaning 'fool') was a 'surly and mean' man, but his wife Abigail was 'clever and beautiful', personifying  the fool and the virtuous wife in wisdom literature. The first part of the narrative (verses 2–12) detailed how Nabal foolishly refused David's request for provision, which was carefully structured in verses 5–8: 
 the offer of peace and friendship to Nabal and his house
 a reminder that Nabal's shepherds were not harmed when they were with David's men (easily verifiable)
 there is a request for supplies, as a compensation for David's protection to Nabal's shepherds.
Nabal behaved arrogantly with his two questions in verse 10 dismissing David as a nonentity and providing hints that he knew about David's breach with Saul ('men who come from I do not know where'). The reference to Nabal as ben blliya'al in verse 17 may classify him with those who despised Saul when he was king-elect (1 Samuel 10:27) and suggest that Nabal also was rejecting a king-elect and refusing to pay him tribute. In anger of the humiliation, David was in danger of taking matters in his own hand and not relying on YHWH, but he was saved from taking foolish action through the interference of Abigail, Nabal's wife, who was informed of the situation by one of Nabal's servants, who liked David and was critical of his own master's rash response (verses 14–18). Abigail intercepted David as he was on his way to annihilate the house of Nabal (verse 22), without consulting her husband, who she counted as a fool (verse 25). Without Abigail's intervention David would have become guilty of 'blood-guilt' and would have 'taken vengeance' with his own hand instead of restraining himself and trusting God, as detailed in Abigail's words (verses 26–31) and David's response (verses 32–34). When Nabal died of sickness, David remembered Abigail (verse 30) and decided to take her as his wife, which also gave David another advantage, for the house of Nabal was a prominent member of the Calebite clan and had control over Hebron, so marrying Nabal's widow would give David control of that particular territory (cf. marrying Ahinoam of Jezreel as another wife), that would also be significant when David later was declared king at Hebron (2 Samuel 2:1–4).

Verse 5
So David sent ten young men. And David said to the young men, “Go up to Carmel, and go to Nabal and greet him in my name.
"Carmel": was the same place where Saul built a monument for himself (1 Samuel 15:12), so Nabal could actually be a supporter of Saul.

Verse 39
For the Lord has returned the wickedness of Nabal on his own head."
And David sent and proposed to Abigail, to take her as his wife.
"Abigail" became David's third wife, after marrying Michal (who has been given to marriage to another man by Saul; 1 Samuel 25:44) and Ahinoam of Jezreel (not the same as Ahinoam, the wife of Saul).

See also

Related Bible parts: 1 Samuel 24, 1 Samuel 26, 1 Chronicles 3

Notes

References

Sources

Commentaries on Samuel

General

External links
 Jewish translations:
 Shmuel I - I Samuel - Chapter 25 (Judaica Press). Hebrew text and English translation [with Rashi's commentary] at Chabad.org
 Christian translations:
 Online Bible at GospelHall.org (ESV, KJV, Darby, American Standard Version, Bible in Basic English)
 1 Samuel chapter 25. Bible Gateway

25